Héctor Copete (born 21 June 1994) is a Colombian footballer.

Career 
On 8 March 2019, Copete signed for USL Championship side Rio Grande Valley FC Toros from América de Cali.

References

External links 
  RGVFC bio

1997 births
Living people
Colombian footballers
Association football defenders
Rio Grande Valley FC Toros players
USL Championship players
Soccer players from California
People from Quibdó
Sportspeople from Chocó Department